Tang-e Khoshk (also known as Tang-e Khosh, Tang-e Khoshkī, and Tang-e Khvosh) is a village in Haparu Rural District, in the Central District of Bagh-e Malek County, Khuzestan Province, Iran. At the 2006 census, its population was 448, in 76 families.

References 

Populated places in Bagh-e Malek County